Eyn ol Qas (also Romanized as ‘Eyn ol Qāş) is a village in Sahneh Rural District, in the Central District of Sahneh County, Kermanshah Province, Iran. At the 2006 census, its population was 186, in 50 families.

References 

Populated places in Sahneh County